William Hartman "Bud" Roffler (September 16, 1930 – January 20, 2015), also known as Bill Roffler, was an American football defensive back. He attended Lewis and Clark High School in Spokane, Washington, before playing college football, baseball and basketball for the Washington State Cougars. He died in Spokane on January 20, 2015, of pneumonia.

References

External links
Pro Football Reference 
Pro Football Archives

1930 births
2015 deaths
People from Whitman County, Washington
Players of American football from Washington (state)
Washington State Cougars football players
Philadelphia Eagles players
Baseball players from Washington (state)
Washington State Cougars baseball players
Basketball players from Washington (state)
American men's basketball players
Washington State Cougars men's basketball players
Deaths from pneumonia in Washington (state)